Irish abortion referendum can refer to any of several referendums regarding Irish legislation:

 in 1983: Eighth Amendment of the Constitution of Ireland
 in 1992: Twelfth Amendment of the Constitution Bill 1992
 in 1992: Thirteenth Amendment of the Constitution of Ireland
 in 1992: Fourteenth Amendment of the Constitution of Ireland
 in 2002: Twenty-fifth Amendment of the Constitution Bill 2002
 in 2018: Thirty-sixth Amendment of the Constitution of Ireland

See also
 Abortion in the Republic of Ireland